The list of symphonies in D-flat major includes:

Paul Büttner 
Symphony No.3 (1915)
Erwin Dressel
Symphony in D-flat major (1928)
 Anastazy Wilhelm Dreszer (1843 - 1907)
 Symphony No. 1, Op. 3 (1865)
Howard Hanson
 Symphony No. 2, "Romantic" (1930)
Nikolai Myaskovsky
Symphony No. 25, Op. 69 (1945-6)
Ture Rangström
Symphony No. 3, "Song under the Stars"

References

See also
List of symphonies by key

D flat major
Symphonies